Sudhir Krishnaswamy (born 1975) is an Indian academic, administrator, and civil society activist who is currently the Vice-Chancellor of the National Law School of India University (NLSIU) and is a co-founder of the not-for-profit research trust Centre for Law and Policy Research (CLPR). Krishnaswamy took over as VC of NLSIU from R. Venkata Rao in September 2019. Krishnaswamy is the first alumnus of NLSIU to be appointed as the VC of the institution. On 6 May 2020, Facebook appointed him to its content oversight board. He was awarded the Infosys Prize 2022 in the Humanities category, for his insightful understanding of the Indian Constitution.

Background and Education
Krishnaswamy was born on 3 June 1975 in Bangalore, India.Being an alumnus of St. Joseph's Boys' High School, he also graduated from the National Law School of India University (NLSIU), Bangalore with a B.A. LL.B. Subsequently, he read for the BCL at the University of Oxford as a Rhodes Scholar. He further obtained a D.Phil. from the same institution in 2008. Krishnaswamy has been a Teaching Fellow in Law at the Pembroke College at the University of Oxford, an assistant professor at NLSIU and a professor at the West Bengal National University of Juridical Sciences. He was head of School of Public Policy and Governance at Azim Premji University Bengaluru.

Dr. Krishnaswamy has also worked in the Prime Minister's Committee on Infrastructure and the Kasturirangan Committee on Governance of Bangalore. He has authored a book titled ‘Democracy and Constitutionalism in India’ which was published by the Oxford University Press in 2009.

Bibliography

Books 
 Democracy and Constitutionalism in India: A Study of the Basic Structure Doctrine (Oxford University Press 2008)

Articles 
 Access  to  Knowledge  and  Traditional  Knowledge  Protection  in  R  Subramaniam  and  L  Shaver (eds) Access to Knowledge in India (Bloomsbury Academic 2011)
 Sudhir Krishnaswamy and Madhav Khosla Understanding our Supreme Court 46 Economic and Political Weekly 71 (2011)
 Sudhir Krishnaswamy and Madhav Khosla Military Power and the Constitution 611 Seminar (2010)
 Constitutional Durability 615 Seminar (2010)
 Mashelkar Report on IP  Rights  Version II: Wrong  Again 44 Economic  and Political Weekly 27 (2009)
 Sudhir Krishnaswamy and Madhav Khosla Regional Emergencies under Article 356: The Extent of Judicial Review 3 Indian Journal of Constitutional Law 168 (2009)
 Sudhir Krishnaswamy and Madhav Khosla Reading AK Thakur v Union of India: Legal Effect and Significance 43 Economic and Political Weekly 53 (2008)
 Where Public Law and Private Law Meet: Horizontal Rights in the Indian Constitution in C Raj Kumar (eds) Human  Rights,  Criminal  Justice  and  Constitutional  Empowerment(Oxford University Press, Delhi 2007)
 Reliance  Airports  Case:  Public Law  and  Public  Sector  Reform 41 Economic  and  Political Weekly 4239 (2006)
 Intellectual Property and India’s Development Policy 1 Indian Journal of Law and Technology (2006)
 Are  our  IP  laws  promoting  or  suppressing  Indian  Intellectual  Property? India IP Essay Contest Winner (2004)

References 

Law of India
1975 births
Living people
Facebook Oversight Board members
People from Bangalore